The Principality of Theodoro, also known as Gothia or the Principality of Theodoro-Mangup, was a Greek principality in the southern part of Crimea, specifically on the foothills of the Crimean Mountains. It represented one of the final rump states of the Eastern Roman Empire and the last territorial vestige of the Crimean Goths until its conquest by the Ottoman Empire by the Ottoman Albanian Gedik Ahmed Pasha in 1475. Its capital was Doros, also sometimes called Theodoro and now known as Mangup. The state was closely allied with the Empire of Trebizond.

History
In the late 12th century, the Crimean peninsula had seceded from the Byzantine Empire, but soon after the sack of Constantinople in 1204 parts of it were included in the Trapezuntine Gazarian Perateia. This dependence was never very strong and was eventually replaced by the invading Mongols, who in 1238 poured into the peninsula, occupied its east and enforced a tribute on the western half, including Gothia. Apart from said tribute their influence was limited, leaving administrative matters in native hands.

The Principality of Gothia is first mentioned in the early 14th century, with the earliest date offered by the post-Byzantine historian Theodore Spandounes, who records the existence of a "Prince of Gothia" in the reign of Andronikos III Palaiologos (1328–1341). Further references occur over the course of the 14th century, with several scholars identifying the "Dmitry", one of the three Tatar princes in the Battle of Blue Waters (c. 1362/1363), with a Prince of Gothia. The name, in this case, may possibly be the baptismal name of a Tatar lord of Mangup, named Khuitani (see below). The name "Theodoro" (in the corrupted form Θεοδωραω) appears for the first time in a Greek inscription also dated to c. 1361/1362, and then again as "Theodoro Mangop" in a Genoese document of 1374. It was suggested by A. Mercati that the form is a corruption of the Greek plural Theodoroi 'the Theodores', meaning Saints Theodore Stratelates and Theodore Tiro, but N. Bănescu proposed the alternative explanation that it resulted from the definitive Greek name τὸ Δόρος (to Doros) or τὸ Δόρυ (to Dory), after the early medieval name of the region. Whatever its provenance, the name stuck: by the 1420s the official titulature of the prince read "Lord of the city of Theodoro and the Maritime Region", while colloquially it was called Θεοδωρίτσι (Theodoritsi, 'little Theodoro') by its inhabitants.

In 1395 the warlord Tamerlane invaded the Crimean peninsula, destroying several towns including Gothia's capital Theodoro. After his death in 1404 Gothia grew to become one of the most significant powers of the Black Sea, profiting from a period of Genoese instability and the neglect of its Black Sea colonies, but also the rise of the Crimean Khanate. In 1432 Gothia sided with Venice against Genoa due to the latter's promise to grant Gothia access to the sea.

The principality had peaceful relations with the Golden Horde to its north, paying an annual tribute as vassals, but was in constant strife with Genoese Gazaria colonies to the south over access to the coasts and the trade that went through the Crimean harbors. A narrow strip of the coastal land from Yamboli (Balaklava) in the west to Allston (Alushta) in the east initially part of the principality soon fell under Genoese control. Local Greeks called this region Parathalassia ("seashore"), while under Genoese rule it was known as Captainship of Gothia. After they had lost harbors on the southern coast Theodorites built a new port called Avlita at the mouth of the Chernaya River and fortified it with the fortress of Kalamata (modern Inkerman).

During 1474, the people of Caffa appeared to have been on the verge of rebellion; official documents from this year describe the damage done to Gothic landowners and farmers or the burning of buildings in the border districts of Alushta and Cembalo. The Prince at the time, Isaac (Italian documents write him Saichus or Saicus and the Russian Isaiko), presented a formal complaint to the Genoese fearing a war with Caffa. On 6 June 1475, the Ottoman Albanian commander Gedik Ahmet Pasha conquered Caffa after five days of siege.

The siege of Mangup began sometime in September. The prince had three hundred Wallachians fighting in the defense. According to Vasiliev, the city endured five major assaults during the siege; in the end, Theodoro's food supply was blockaded and the people began to succumb to famine. At the end of December 1475, Mangup surrendered to the Ottomans under the condition that the Prince, the people, and their property would be spared. While much of the rest of Crimea remained part of the Crimean Khanate, now an Ottoman vassal, the former lands of Theodoro and southern Crimea were administered directly by the Sublime Porte. 
According to the Ottoman historian Ashik Pasha-Zade, after Mangup surrendered the Ottomans treated it the same way as Caffa. The Ottomans took the chiefs of the city and brought them to Constantinople where they were executed. Their treasures were handed over to the Sultan, while their wives and daughters were given as presents to the Sultan's officials. After the city's capitulation, one of the churches was converted into a mosque, where a prayer was said for the Sultan. According to an Ottoman chronicler, "the house of the infidel became the house of Islam."

With the fall of Mangup, the Principality of Theodoro had ceased to exist and taking with it the last remnant of the Roman Empire, after 2,228 years of Roman civilization since the legendary Founding of Rome in 753 BC.

Princes of Theodoro

According to Vasiliev, he is possibly to be identified with the hekatontarches Khuitani, who erected the stone inscription mentioning the name "Theodoro" on the walls of Mangup at about the same time.

The princes following after Demetrios are known solely through Russian sources. A branch of the  Greek dynasty Gabras were the rulers of Theodoro and are commonly identified by scholars with the family known from Russian sources as "Khovra". The prince Stephen ("Stepan Vasilyevich Khovra"), emigrated to Moscow in 1391 or 1402 along with his son Gregory. His patronymic implies the existence of a father named Basil, who possibly preceded him as prince (and was in turn possibly Demetrios' son). Stephen and Gregory became monks, and Gregory later founded the Simonov Monastery in Moscow. The Russian noble families of Khovrin and Golovin claimed descent from them. In Gothia, Stephen was succeeded by another son, Alexios I, who ruled until his death in 1444–45 or 1447. Alexios' heir was his eldest son John, who was married to Maria Asanina, a woman connected to the Byzantine imperial dynasty of the Palaiologoi and the noble lines of Asanes and Tzamplakon. The couple had a son, also named Alexios, who died young c. 1446/7, probably at Trebizond. His epitaph, titled "To the Prince's son", was composed by John Eugenikos and offers unique genealogical data on the family. John's reign appears to have been very short, or he may indeed not have reigned at all – A. Vasiliev speculates that he left Gothia for Trebizond as soon as Alexios I died – so another son of Alexios I, Olubei, succeeded as prince in c. 1447 and ruled until c. 1458. A daughter of Alexios I, Maria of Gothia, became in 1426 the first wife of the last Trapezuntine emperor, David.

Olubei is no longer mentioned after c. 1458, and no princes are known by name for some while; Genoese documents only mention "the lord of Theodoro and his brothers" (dominus Tedori et fratres ejus). In 1465, Prince Isaac is mentioned, probably Olubei's son and hence possibly reigning already since c. 1458. In the face of the mounting Ottoman danger, he engaged in a rapprochement with the Genoese at Caffa and wed his sister Maria Asanina Palaiologina to Stephen the Great, ruler of Moldavia. His increasingly pro-Ottoman stance in later years, however, led to his overthrow by his brother Alexander in 1475, with Stephen the Great's backing. This came too late to save Theodoro: in December 1475, after conquering the other Christian strongholds along the Crimean coast, the Ottomans captured the city after a three-month siege. Alexander and his family were taken captive to Constantinople, where the prince was beheaded. His son was forcibly converted to Islam, and his wife and daughters became part of the Sultan's harem.

Culture

Gothia's population was a mixture of Greeks, Crimean Goths, Alans, Circassians, Bulgars, Cumans, Kipchaks, and other ethnic groups, most of whom were adherents to Orthodox Christianity and Hellenized. The principality's official language was Greek.

Various cultural influences can be traced in Gothia: its architecture and Christian wall paintings were essentially Byzantine, although some of its fortresses also display a local as well as Genoese character. Inscribed marble slabs found in the region were decorated with a mixture of Byzantine, Italian, and Tatar decorative elements.

In 1901, a Greek inscription was discovered in the city of Mangup. The inscription shows that in 1503, almost thirty years after the Turkish conquest, the inhabitants of Mangup still spoke Greek. The city was under the power of a Turkish governor. The next years, many Greek inscriptions, dated before the Ottoman conquest were found at the city.

Greek inscriptions were also found at the city of Inkerman.

Βyzantine bronze weights excavated at Mangup supply evidence that the residents followed the imperial weighting system.

After the Turkish conquest in 1475, the Turks preserved the religion and religious institutions of the Greeks, as well as the Greek ecclesiastical organisation.

See also
 Despotate of the Morea
 Fall of Constantinople

References

Sources

External links
Brief history of Theodoro Principality (Mangup) ENG
ISOPE. Ancient Inscriptions of the Northern Black Sea (also features inscriptions from Theodoro)

Further reading
Androuidis, Pascal (2017): "Présence de l’aigle bicéphale en Trebizonde et dans la principauté grecque de Théodoro en Crimée (XIVe-XVe siècles"

Lists of princes
Principality of Theodoro
Former monarchies
Former principalities